"Does It Matter Irene?" is the first disc released by post-punk group The Mothmen, on Absurd Records, in 1979. Shortly before, the band members were involved with two known Manchester bands, guitarist/bassist Dave Rowbotham, bassist/guitarist Tony Bowers and drummer Chris Joyce with The Durutti Column and vocalist Bob Harding with Alberto Y Lost Trios Paranoias. Bowers also was member of Alberto Y Lost Trios Paranoias before The Durutti Column.

This was the only single released on Absurd. The band later signed Do It! to release in 1981 their first album Pay Attention! and their next single Show Me Your House And Car.

However, the band waited the entire 1980 working in separated ways. Dave Rowbotham was recording material with Pauline Murray And The Invisible Girls, Chris Joyce joined Pink Military, with whom began to work, and Tony Bowers was producing for the latter band.

The B-side of the song, "Please Let Go", was later re-versioned for the debut album Pay Attention!.

Track listing
A-side
"Does It Matter Irene?"

B-side
"Please Let Go"

Credits
Bob Harding: lead vocals, guitar, bass guitar, organ
David Rowbotham: guitar, bass
Tony Bowers: bass, guitar, violin, vocals
Chris Joyce: drums

References

External links
Discogs.com
Webcitation.org

1979 debut singles
1979 songs
Post-punk songs
British new wave songs
Song articles with missing songwriters